England competed at the 1934 British Empire Games in London, England, from 4 August to 11 August 1934.

The athletes that competed are listed below.

Athletes

Athletics

(Men)

(Women)

+ Edith Halstead was later sexually reassigned and took the name Edwin "Eddie" Halstead, brother of Nellie Halstead.

Boxing

Cycling

Diving

(Men)

(Women)

Lawn bowls

Swimming

(Men)

(Women)

Wrestling

References

1934
Nations at the 1934 British Empire Games
British Empire Games